Wychert or witchert (with a number of variant spellings existing and meaning "white earth") is a natural blend of white chalk and clay which is mixed with straw to make walls and buildings, usually then thatched or topped with red clay tiles.  This historic method of building construction is localised to Haddenham and the surrounding local area in Buckinghamshire.  One of the largest known wychert structures is Haddenham Methodist Church.

The method of building with wychert is similar to that of a cob building.  To maintain the rigid nature of wychert it must not become too dry for risk of crumbling, nor too wet for risk of turning to a slime.  Keeping wychert well ventilated and not subject to excess condensation is therefore highly recommended.  Any render applied to a wychert wall must therefore be of a breathable material — rendering wychert walls with a lime based render is therefore common practice.

A wychert house has been constructed at Chiltern Open Air Museum in Chalfont St Peter, Buckinghamshire.

See also
 Vernacular architecture

References

External links
Earth Buildings and their Repair - by Dirk Bouwens
Haddenham Museum with opening hours
The Witchert Buildings of Buckinghamshire, England:Learning Sustainable Construction from our Ancestors(Google cached version accessed 10 March 2006)

Soil-based building materials